Agrias aedon, the Aedon agrias, is a butterfly of the family Nymphalidae. It is found in the Neotropical realm.

Subspecies
A. a. aedon (Colombia, Venezuela, possibly Panama)
A. a. rodriguezi Schaus, 1918 (Mexico, Guatemala, Costa Rica)
A. a. pepitoensis Michael, 1930 (western Colombia)

References
 Rebillard, P. (1961), "Révision systématique des Lépidoptères Nymphalides du genre Agrias". Memoires du Museum National d`Histoire Naturelle, Nouvelle Serie, Serie A, Zoologie, Tome XXII, Fasicule 2.

Charaxinae
Butterflies described in 1848